Toxicochlespira pagoda is a species of sea snail, a marine gastropod mollusk in the family Mangeliidae.

Description

Distribution
This species occurs in the Ceram Sea, Indonesia, and off the Philippines, Guadalcanal, New Guinea.

References

 Sysoev A.V. & Kantor Y. (1990) A new genus and species of "Cochlespira-like" turrids. Apex 5(1–2): 1–6

External links
 
 MNHN, Paris : Toxicochlespira pagoda

pagoda
Gastropods described in 1990